Pseudothonalmus divisus is a species of beetle in the family Cerambycidae. It was described by Chevrolat in 1858.

References

Heteropsini
Beetles described in 1858